"Love Sees No Colour" is a song recorded by German act U96. It was released in May 1993 as the first single off its second album, Replugged (1993), on which it appears as second track. It added sung male vocals, which was also going to be one of the distinctive marks of the project. The words contained in the title are the only lyrics of the song. It achieved success in many countries, including Austria, Denmark, Finland, Germany, Spain, Sweden and Switzerland where it reached the top 10. On the Eurochart Hot 100, "Love Sees No Colour" peaked at number 10. German band Bass Bumpers participated in several remixes of the song.

Critical reception
Raùl Cairo from Music & Media wrote that "the song is a charming combination of ambient techno sounds with an irresistible poppy hook."<ref>Cairo, Raùl (July 24, 1993). "Marketing the Music — U96 Surfaces Again". p.8. Music & Media.</ref> Andy Beevers from Music Week described it as "another stomping commercial rave track, this time carrying an anti-fascist message." Ralph Tee from the RM Dance Update noted, "A big moody wave of synths introduces this Euro house record that sounds strangely dated on first listen with its repeated spoken title line and slightly cheesy bassline, but it grows on you with each play." He added, "Well produced and easy to programme so it's sure to get plenty of attention." Damon Albarn and Alex James of Blur reviewed the song for Smash Hits, giving it four out of five. Albarn said, "It sounds very Germanic. They make music like they make cars. This is Vorsprung durch Technik music. In Germany I expect it is very popular." David Petrilla from The Weekender'' complimented its "pure uplifting energy", adding that "the familiar heavy synthesizer sequences drove me crazy".

Track listings
 7" single / CD single
 "Love Sees No Colour" (version 1 radio edit) — 3:44
 "The Pop Crisis" — 3:35

 12" maxi
 "Love Sees No Colour" (version 1) — 5:57
 "Love Sees No Colour" (version 2) — 5:57
 "The Pop Crisis" — 3:35

 CD maxi
 "Love Sees No Colour" (radio edit) — 3:46
 "Love Sees No Colour" (version 1) — 5:57
 "Love Sees No Colour" (version 2) — 5:57
 "The Pop Crisis" — 3:35

 CD maxi / 12" maxi - Remixes
 "Love Sees No Colour" (Bass Bumpers remix) — 5:44
 "Love Sees No Colour" (house mix) — 5:53
 "Love Sees No Colour" (version 1 instrumental mix) — 5:57

Credits
 Written by AC-Beat, Lagonda, Castioni and Wycombe
 Vocals by Ingo Hauss
 Produced by Matiz / AC 16
 Artwork by Neue Hülle

Charts

Weekly charts

Year-end charts

References

External links

1993 singles
U96 songs
1993 songs
English-language German songs
Song recordings produced by Alex Christensen
Songs written by Alex Christensen
Techno songs